Mihaela Marinova (born 7 May 1998) is a Bulgarian singer - Mihaela Marinova is a multiple-time award winner and X Factor Bulgaria 2017 finalist. She is also part of the country’s biggest record label – Virginia Records. 
Having performed with her at the X Factor finale, British superstar James Arthur shares:
“When I first saw Mihaela, I thought she had an incredible talent. She’s got all it takes to become a world success.”
Her groundbreaking singles and videos have gathered more than 60M views and streams. Each of the tracks have been at leading positions in the Official Airplay Chart, with her smashing debut “Stapka Napred” (2015) having spent 5 consecutive weeks at #1. The following year (2016) the song brought Mihaela the prestigious awards “Song of the Year”, “Best Debut” and “Video of the Year” at the Bulgarian Annual Music Awards.

Career

X Factor Bulgaria

2013: Season 2
Mihaela participated in the 2nd season of the show and make it to the judge's houses where her menthor Zaki decided to choose between her or Ana-Maria Yanakieva since they both were 15 years old and the show have limit of 16 years. Zaki decided to give chance to Ana-Maria, but gave Mihaela a special "golden ticket" which allowed her to start from judges houses in the next season of the show. Later Ana Maria finished as runner-up in the show.

2014–2015: Season 3
Even though Mihaela had a reserved place for the judges houses, she decided not to use it and start the show from the auditions, as she said that would have been unfair to the other participants. This time she made it through to the finals and finished in third place after Slavin Slavchev won the season. At the final she made a duet with James Arthur, the winner of the ninth series of The X Factor UK in 2012.

2015–present: Debut single and first steps
Mihaela Marinova auditioned for Series 3 of X Factor Bulgaria and made it all the way to the final as part of the Girls category mentored by Sanya Armutlieva.
She finished in 3rd place behind runner-up Nevena Peykova and winner Slavin Slavchev.

Mihaela Marinova was signed by Virginia Records. In the summer of 2015 her debut single "Stapka Napred" (Step Forward) was released. Her single become number 1 in charts in Bulgaria with over a million views in YouTube. 

In 2019 she participated in the Bulgarian edition of "The masked singer", she was presented as Garvanat (The Raven) and ended up winning the show!

Currently, Mihaela Marinova participates in the Bulgarian edition of "Tu cara me suena" 

In March 2021, Mihaela was criticized globally for her insensitive and racist appearance in black face for a Bulgarian show. The world slammed her for her performance and yet she never apologized.

Discography

Albums
Stapka Napred (2020)

Singles

References

External links
 
 
 

1998 births
Living people
Musicians from Sofia
21st-century Bulgarian women singers
X Factor (Bulgarian TV series)
Masked Singer winners